The Göta älv ("River of (the) Geats") is a river that drains lake Vänern into the Kattegat, at the city of Gothenburg, on the western coast of Sweden. It was formed at the end of the last glaciation, as an outflow channel from the Baltic Ice Lake to the Atlantic Ocean and nowadays it has the largest drainage basin in Scandinavia.

The Göta älv is located in Götaland, with the river itself being a site of early Geatish settlement. The Bohus Fortress is located by the river at Kungälv. There the river splits into two, with the northern part being the Nordre älv and the southern part keeping the name Göta älv; the two arms of the river enclose the island of Hisingen.

At Trollhättan there is a dam, canal locks and a hydropower station in the river. The locks make the river navigable, even for large cargo vessels ( long). The artificial parts are called Trollhätte Canal. The river and the canal is part of a mostly inland waterway, Göta Canal, which spans the width of Sweden to the Baltic Sea south of Stockholm.

The power station supplied electric power to the heavy steel industry concentrated around Trollhättan Falls, contributing to its industrial revolution. In the summer months the spillway of the dam is opened for a few minutes daily and tourists gather to see the water rushing down the river (picture).

Now a water tunnel between Vänersborg and Uddevalla is considered as a rescue solution.

There is a large risk of landslides along the river and historical records of 15 landslides exist. The largest occurred in the years 1150, 1648, 1950, 1957 and 1977 (Tuve landslide).

Name in other languages
In Old Norse the river was called the Gautelfr; in Icelandic it is Gautelfur; and in Norwegian it is sometimes rendered as Gøtelv.

See also
 Name of the Goths

References

Götaland
Gothenburg
Hisingen
Bohuslän
Rivers of Västra Götaland County
Ramsar sites in Sweden